There are 11 official public holidays in France. The Alsace region and the Moselle department observe 2 additional days. These holidays do not shift when they fall during a week-end, which means that the average number of observed public holidays falling on weekdays is 8.7 and ranges from 7 to 10. Most Asian countries and all North American countries observe between 2 and 10 more public holidays per year on weekdays.

Public holidays in France

Overseas territories

Guadeloupe

 Mi-Carême (mid-Lent); occurs on a Thursday, 22 days after Ash Wednesday; therefore, between 26 February and 1 April.
 Good Friday (Vendredi saint)
Abolition of slavery: May 27.

French Guiana

Abolition of slavery: June 10.

Martinique 

Abolition of slavery: May 22.

New Caledonia 

 Citizenship Day (Fête de la citoyenneté): September 24.

French Polynesia 

 Missionary Day (Arrivée de l'Évangile): on March 5.
 Internal Autonomy Day (Fête de l’autonomie): June 29.

Réunion

 Réunion Freedom Day (Fête réunionnaise de la liberté; Fèt Kaf) December 20.

Saint Barthélemy 

Abolition of slavery: October 9.

Saint Martin 

Abolition of slavery: May 28.

Wallis and Futuna 

 Feast of Saint Peter Chanel: April 28.
 Festival of the territory (Fête du territoire): July 29.

Notes

Note: French law dictates that work should stop, but be paid, only for the Fête du Travail (May Day, 1 May), except in industries where it is infeasible to stop working. The rest of the public holidays are listed in statute law, but law does not dictate that work should stop; however a leave from work may be granted by the employer or by convention collective (agreement between employers' and employees' unions).

In 2005, French prime minister Jean-Pierre Raffarin removed Pentecost (Whit) Monday's status as a public holiday. This decision was eventually overruled by French courts in 2008. Employers are free to decide whether to make Whit Monday a day off or not.

References

 
France
Holidays